Rangan may refer to:
Rangan, Razavi Khorasan, a village in Razavi Khorasan Province
Venkat Rangan, Indian computer scientist 
Gumbok Rangan, a mountain of India
Rangan Chakraborty (b. 1957), Indian filmmaker